Allahqoli Khan Zanganeh was a Kurdish nobleman from the Zanganeh tribe, who served as the governor of Kermanshah under the Zand dynasty from the mid-1750s until his death in 1785, when the Ardalan governor Khosrow Khan Bozorg defeated him and seized the city.

Sources 
 
 

Zanganeh
Zand governors of Kermanshah
18th-century Iranian politicians
People from Kermanshah
Iranian Kurdish people